Jitul Sonowal (born in Dibrugarh Assam) is an Indian singer, music director, composer, lyricist and entertainer in the field of Assamese modern song and music since 1988.  

He filtered the Assamese song in a modern way and he likewise works in Assamese Films and Movies; and Film Divisions of Assam. Some of the popular hits songs he contributed in Assamese music industry like "Jodi ketiyaba", "Abeli porot", "Bukure Axabure", "Dure Dure", "Ai beli Bihure", "Jon Jole Tora Jole", "Ketiyaba Ajanite", "Mur Mon Aji", "Moromi Logori", "Najaba Atori", "Rimjhim Boroxar" etc. He directed several music in assamese movies such as Hepaah, Xonghat and Bukur Majot Jwole etc. His Popular albums are Niribili Godhuli, Bristi, Natun Lahar, Sonali etc. 

Most of the Music Albums of Jitul Sonowal co-starred with renowned singers like Usha Mangeshkar, Anuradha Paudwal, Kavita Krishnamurti, Dr. Sangita Kakati, Udit Narayan, Kumar Sanu, and Zubeen Garg, etc. 

Jitul Sonowal decided to join politics in 2014 he has joined the BJP along with several Assamese artists.

Jitul Sonowal is also the Director of North East Zone Cultural Centre (NEZCC).
Recently, he is appointed as Srimanta Sankardeva Kalakshetra Society vice-chairperson.

Music Albums

Contribution in Assamese music industry 
Jitul Sonowal improved the Assamese music industry by bringing western influence into Assamese music and blend it properly with the traditional music of the region. During the time when there were few prominent Assamese singers, he invited several Bollywood singers to Assam create albums with modern music.

Awards and nominations

External links
 
Jitul Sonowal  at hungama.com
Jitul Sonowal  at iTunes
Jitul Sonowal  at JioSaavn

References

Indian film score composers
Indian male singers
Indian male pop singers
Living people
Year of birth missing (living people)
Assamese singers